Ojibway, Ojibwa, or Ojibwe may refer to:

People and cultures
 The Ojibwe (or "Chippewa") people, a native people of North America
 The Ojibwe language, also called "Anishinaabe", an Algonquian language traditionally spoken by the Algonquin, Nipissing, Ojibwa, Saulteaux, Mississaugas, and Odawa, native peoples of North America

Places
 Ojibwa (community), Wisconsin, an unincorporated community
 Ojibway, Michigan, an inunincorporated community
 Ojibway, Missouri, a ghost town
 Ojibwa, Wisconsin, a town 
 Glacial Lake Ojibway, a prehistoric lake in what is now eastern Canada
 Ojibway Parkway a road on the far west side of Windsor, Ontario, Canada
 Ojibway Prairie Complex, a complex of parks on the west side of Windsor, Ontario, Canada, including Ojibway Park and Ojibway Prairie Provincial Nature Reserve
 Ojibway Provincial Park, a park in northwestern Ontario, Canada

Watercraft
 Ojibway, a 1942 lake freighter operated by Lower Lakes Towing
HMCS Ojibwa, a submarine of the Canadian Forces

Other uses
Ojibway Club, a community centre located in Pointe au Baril, Ontario, Canada